The Moldovan Cup is a football competition, held annually in Moldova. The winner qualifies for the UEFA Europa Conference League first qualifying round.

Finals
The finals were:

Goalscorers

Soviet time winners

 1945: Dinamo Chişinău – Tiraspol XI 2:1
 1946: Dinamo Chişinău – Spartak Chişinău 3:2
 1947: Dinamo Chişinău – Dinamo Bender 3:0
 1948: Bender XI – Burevestnik Bender 2:1
 1949: Lokomotiv Chişinău – Spartak Bălți 2:1
 1950: Burevestnik Bender – Krasnoe Znamya Chişinău 9:0
 1951: Trud Chişinău – Krasnaya Zvezda Tiraspol 8:0, 3:2
 1952: Dinamo Chişinău – Krasnoe Znamya Chişinău 6:1
 1953: Dinamo Chişinău – Burevestnik Bender 2:1
 1954: Lokomotiv Ungheni – Burevestnik Bender 5:2
 1955: Burevestnik Bender – KPKhI Chişinău 2:0
 1956: Burevestnik Bender – KPKhI Chişinău 1:0
 1957: KPKhI Chişinău – Spartak Tiraspol 3:0
 1958: Lokomotiv Chişinău – Urozhai Rîbniţa 5:1
 1959: KPKhI Chişinău – Konservnyi Zavod Tiraspol 2:2, 4:1
 1960: KPKhI Chişinău – Tiraspol XI 1:0
 1961: Moldavkabel Bender – Raipromkombinat Lipcani  5:3
 1962: Moldavkabel Bender – Vibropribor Chişinău  1:0
 1963: Volna Chişinău – ? ?:?
 1964: Temp Tiraspol – Lokomotiv Bălți 2:1
 1965: Traktor Chişinău – Temp Tiraspol 4:2
 1966: Vibropribor Chişinău – Temp Tiraspol 1:0
 1967: Traktor Chişinău – Energia Tiraspol ?:?
 1968: Temp Tiraspol – Stroitel Bălți 5:0
 1969: Temp Tiraspol – Vibropribor Chişinău 5:1
 1970: Pishchevik Bender – Trud Bălți 2:1
 1971: Pishchevik Bender – Stroitel Bălți 4:2
 1972: Pishchevik Bender – Avtomobilist Orhei 2:0
 1973: Politekhnik Chişinău – Pishchevik Bender 4:2
 1974: Dinamo Chişinău – Chaika Bender 4:0
 1975: Dinamo Chişinău – Energetic Dubăsari 6:2
 1976: Stroitel Tiraspol – Urozhai Édineţ 1:0
 1977: Grănicerul Glodeni – Stroitel Tiraspol 2:0
 1978: KPKhI Chişinău – Avtomobilist Bălți 2:0
 1979: Kolos Pelinia – Kolos Slobozia 4:2
 1980: Dnestr Ciobruciu – Chaika Bender 4:1
 1981-1983:  
 1984: Luch Soroca – Tekstilshik Tiraspol 2:0
 1985: Tekstilshik Tiraspol – Iscra Rîbniţa 1:1 aet. (pen. 4-2)
 1986: Stroitel Făleşti – Avtomobilist Tiraspol 1:0
 1987: Stroitel Făleşti – Plastic Tiraspol 4:1
 1988: FC Tighina – Cristalul Făleşti 7:0
 1989: FC Tighina-2 – Cristalul Făleşti 4:3 aet.
 1990: Moldavgidromash Chişinău – Cristalul Făleşti 1:0
 1991: Moldova Borosenii Noi – Constructorul Chişinău 2:0

Performance by club

 Clubs in italics do not exist anymore.

References

External links 
  

 
Cup
Moldova
1992 establishments in Moldova
Recurring sporting events established in 1992
Annual sporting events in Moldova